Miss Venezuela 1952, the 1st Miss Venezuela pageant, was held at Valle Arriba Golf Club in Caracas, Venezuela, on June 7, 1952, after days of events. The winner of the pageant was Sofía Silva, Miss Bolívar, who was the first Miss Venezuela in the history.

Results
Miss Venezuela 1952 - Sofía Silva (Miss Bolívar)
1st runner-up - Ligia de Lima (Miss Anzoátegui)
2nd runner-up - Vilma Viana (Miss Guárico)
3rd runner-up - Olga Buvat (Miss Distrito Federal)
4th runner-up - Marbelia Gardier (Miss Amazonas)

Delegates

 Miss Amazonas - Marbelia Gardier Gago
 Miss Anzoátegui - Ligia De Lima
 Miss Aragua - Maruja Cordero Rodríguez
 Miss Bolívar - Sofía Silva Inserri
 Miss Carabobo - Miriam Guerra Mass
 Miss Distrito Federal - Olga Buvat de Virginy Capriles
 Miss Guárico - Vilma Viana Acosta
 Miss Lara - Yolanda Gil García
 Miss Mérida - Miriam Dávila
 Miss Miranda  - Carmen Elena Alvarez
 Miss Nueva Esparta - Verónica Rodulfo Campos
 Miss Táchira - Ilse Theverkaus Ibarra
 Miss Trujillo - Norah Rangel Alizo
 Miss Yaracuy - Nieves Teresa Contreras Sánchez

External links
Miss Venezuela official website

1952 beauty pageants
1952 in Venezuela